Ponte de Sor is a municipality in Portalegre District in Portugal. The population in 2011 was 16,722, in an area of 839.71 km2.

The present Mayor is Hugo Hilário, elected by the Socialist Party. The municipal holiday is Easter Monday.

Economy
The economy of the municipality is based in agriculture, services and light industries ranging from food to aviation like the British-based company L3 Commercial Training Solutions (L3CTS). However, the main industry is the cork industry, being Ponte de Sor one of the main producing areas of raw and transformed cork worldwide.

Parishes
Administratively, the municipality is divided into 5 civil parishes (freguesias):
 Foros de Arrão 
 Galveias
 Longomel
 Montargil
 Ponte de Sor, Tramaga e Vale de Açor

Notable people 
 Vitória Pais Freire de Andrade (1883–1930) an active Portuguese feminist who also campaigned against bullfighting in Portugal.
 José Luís Peixoto (born 1974) a Portuguese author, poet and playwright.

References

External links
Town Hall official website

Populated places in Portalegre District
Municipalities of Portalegre District
People from Ponte de Sor